Centerville was a hamlet within Readington Township in Hunterdon County, New Jersey, United States. The community was located along Campbell's Brook (now Pleasant Run) and Old York Road.  Centerville grew up because of a tavern that marked the halfway point on the long Swift Sure Stage Line route from New York to Philadelphia.  The hamlet had a  school, a store, a post office, a church and blacksmith.  When the railroads and newer roads were built, Centerville saw few visitors and today all the buildings there are residences.

References

Unincorporated communities in Readington Township, New Jersey
Unincorporated communities in Hunterdon County, New Jersey
Unincorporated communities in New Jersey